Azhiyoor  is a village in Vatakara taluk of Kozhikode district in the state of Kerala, India. Azhiyur is part of Greater Mahé Region. Mahé Railway Station is located in Azhiyoor.

Demographics
 India census, Azhiyur had a population of 28731 with 13351 males and 15380 females.
It is situated close to Mayyazhi (Mahe).

Transportation
Azhiyur village connects to other parts of India through Vatakara city on the west and Kuttiady town on the east.  National highway No.66 passes through Vatakara and the northern stretch connects to Mangalore, Goa and Mumbai.  The southern stretch connects to Cochin and Trivandrum.  The eastern Highway  going through Kuttiady connects to Mananthavady, Mysore and Bangalore. The nearest airports are at Kannur and Kozhikode.  The nearest railway station is at mahe.

Proposed New Mahe Municipality 
The proposed New Mahe Municipality comprises:
Azhiyur panchayat, Vatakara taluk, Kozhikode district, Kerala
New Mahe panchayat, Thalassery taluk, Kannur district, Kerala
Chokli panchayat, Thalassery taluk, Kannur district, Kerala
Panniyannur panchayat, Thalassery taluk, Kannur district, Kerala

See also
 Madappally, Vatakara
 Onchium
 Orkkatteri
 Vatakara

References

Vatakara area